Huangguoshu Waterfall, is one of the largest waterfalls in China and East Asia located on the Baishui River in Anshun, Guizhou province.

Tourism
Together with minor waterfalls, the charms of the waterfall is a natural tourist draw, classified as a AAAAA scenic area by the China National Tourism Administration.

Huangguoshu Waterfall's point of view changes depending on the location of the viewer. One viewing spot is Waterfall-Viewing Pavilion (Guan Bao ting), where the waterfall can be seen from a distance. Another is Water-Viewing Stage (Guan Bao Ting), where the waterfall can be seen from a bird's-eye view. The third is Waterfall-Viewing Stage (Guan Bao Tai) in which visitors raise their heads to see the scene.

There is a special line of buses servicing Huangguoshu Waterfall, the Dragon's Palace at Guiyang, and Anshun railway stations.

The Water-Curtain Cave
It is believed that this is the habitat of Sun Wukong, the protagonist of the Buddhist-fantasy literature Journey to the West.

History
In the book Xu Xiake's Travels, Xu Xiake (1587-1641) described the waterfalls as "the foams rise from the rocks like a mist".

Gallery

See also
 Detian Falls

References

External links

 Huangguoshu Waterfall Official Website
 TravelChinaGuide - Huangguoshu Waterfall

Waterfalls of China
Landforms of Guizhou
Tourist attractions in Guizhou
National parks of China
AAAAA-rated tourist attractions
Block waterfalls